The Kansas City Bridge Company was a bridge building company that built many bridges throughout the Midwest United States in the early 1900s. The company was founded in 1893 and ceased business around 1960.

A number of its works are listed on the U.S. National Register of Historic Places.

Bridges

Missouri River
 Missouri-Kansas-Texas (MKT) Bridge
 Lexington Bridge (Lexington, Missouri)
 Fairfax Bridge
 Rulo Bridge
 Nebraska City Bridge — 1930 through truss Waubonsie Bridge. 
 South Omaha Veterans Memorial Bridge
 Blair Bridge
Asylum Bridge, First St. over Marais des Cygnes Osawatomie, KS (Kansas City Bridge Co.), NRHP-listed
Bridgeport Hill-Hydro OK 66 Segment, OK 66 from Hydro E to Spur US 281 Hydro, OK (Kansas City Bridge Company), NRHP-listed
Carey's Ford Bridge, Over Marais des Cygnes River, E of Osawatomie Osawatomie, KS (Kansas City Bridge Co.), NRHP-listed
Little Deep Fork Creek Bridge, 0.33 mi. E of jct. of E0830 Rd. and N3700 Rd. Bristow, OK (Kansas City Bridge Co.), NRHP-listed
Little Walnut River Pratt Truss Bridge, SW 160th Rd., 0.5 mi. W of int. with Purity Springs Rd. Bois D'Arc, KS (Kansas City Bridge & Iron Co.), NRHP-listed
North Gypsum Creek Truss Leg Bedstead Bridge, Sioux Rd., 0.2 mi. E of int. with 24th Ave., 1.0 mi. S and 2.8 mi. W of Roxbury Roxbury, KS (Kansas City Bridge Co.), NRHP-listed
Papinville Marais des Cygnes River Bridge, Cty. Rd. 648 over the Marais des Cygenes R. Papinville, MO (Kansas City Bridge and Iron Co.), NRHP-listed
Salt Creek Truss Leg Bedstead Bridge, B Rd., 0.6 mi. E of int with 24th Rd., 1.0 mi. N of Barnard Barnard, KS (Kansas City Bridge Co.), NRHP-listed
South Omaha Bridge, US 275/NE 92 over the Missouri R. Omaha, NE and Council Bluffs, IA (Kansas City Bridge Co.), NRHP-listed
Tauy Creek Bridge, Over Tauy Cr. N of I-35 Ottawa, KS (Kansas City Bridge Co.), NRHP-listed

Mississippi River
Huey P. Long Bridge at Baton Rouge, Louisiana.

References

External links
Midwestplaces list of bridges
Kansas City Public Library history

Bridge companies
Companies based in Kansas City, Missouri
Construction and civil engineering companies of the United States
1893 establishments in Kansas
Construction and civil engineering companies established in 1893
American companies established in 1893